Maximilian I of Bavaria may refer to:
 Maximilian I, Elector of Bavaria (1573–1651)
 Maximilian I Joseph of Bavaria (1756–1825)